The Fripp-Fishburne House is a historic building in Walterboro, South Carolina, United States. Built in 1889, it has been renovated several times and currently serves as a private residence.

The house is located at 474 Hampton Street, in the Walterboro historic district, which is about an hour drive from either Charleston, South Carolina or Savannah, Georgia.

The house was originally a one-story home built by Lewis Fripp in 1889. A second story was added in the early 1900s. The Fishburne family next owned the house for over half a century. In 1962, John Hiott purchased the house and renovated it. The next owners were Dan Yarbrough (1994–1999) and Roberto Refinetti (1999-   ).

The front porch, with its four Ionic columns is typical of southern plantation homes. Its grandiose façade, subtly concealed by century-old oak trees naturally decorated with hanging Spanish moss, provides it with the distinction of being the most photographed house in town. Photographs of the Fripp-Fishburne house have appeared in numerous tourist brochures, newspapers, books, magazines, and travel guides.

Notes 

Houses completed in 1800
Historic buildings and structures in the United States
Historic district contributing properties in South Carolina
Houses in Colleton County, South Carolina
National Register of Historic Places in Colleton County, South Carolina
Houses on the National Register of Historic Places in South Carolina